Candiolo railway station serves the town and comune of Candiolo, in the Piedmont region, northwestern Italy. The station is a through station of the Turin-Pinerolo-Torre Pellice railway.

Since 2012 it serves line SFM2, part of the Turin metropolitan railway service.

Services

References

Railway stations in the Metropolitan City of Turin